From the Ladle to the Grave is the third album by Minneapolis Celtic rock band Boiled in Lead. It was the band's first recording with drummer Robin Adnan Anders, whose influence helped push the band further beyond Celtic rock into explorations of other world traditions. These included Bulgarian, Russian-Jewish, and Turkish music, as well as their version of The Hollies’ “Stop! Stop! Stop!” which interpolated a traditional Egyptian melody. The song "Cuz Mapfumo" simultaneously paid tribute to Chicago-based Irish musician Cuz Teahan and Zimbabwean Thomas Mapfumo.

Previous Boiled in Lead albums had consisted entirely of traditional folk and world-music songs, though the band often arranged the songs in nontraditional, harder-rocking ways. Ladle contained Boiled in Lead's first original compositions, "The Microorganism" and "Pig Dog Daddy." Both were written by lead singer Todd Menton, who cited the influence of Billy Bragg and Richard Thompson as songwriters who had successfully fused folk and rock/pop. Menton began writing "The Microorganism," a mournful ballad about the devastation of AIDS, six years before its appearance on Ladle.

The song "My Son John" is a variant of the traditional Irish antiwar ballad "Mrs. McGrath." In an article on the history of the Napoleon-era song, Sing Out! critic Steven L. Jones singled out Boiled in Lead's rendition as a skillful modernization that also stayed true to the song's politics and "underlying rage and terror." The band's version of the song is dedicated to antiwar activist S. Brian Willson, whose legs were cut off when he was struck by a munitions train during a Reagan-era protest of arms shipments to Central America.

The album won a Minnesota Music Award for Album/CD of the Year in 1989.

Personnel
Robin "Adnan" Anders: Trap kit, tambourine, cabasa, log drum, tapan, doumbek, sufi drum, davul, darabouka, tar, gong, def. chimes, beladi, Simmons,
Todd Menton: Electric guitar, vocals, tin whistle, acoustic guitar, mandolin, whistle
Drew Miller: Bass guitar, tuners, turntable
David Stenshoel: Fiddle, electric mandolin, scat, zurna, saxophone

Track listing

Credits
Recorded on the winter solstice in 1987 at Blackberry Way, Minneapolis
Produced by Boiled in Lead and Willie Murphy
Engineered by Mike Owens and Kevin Glynn
Mixed March-June 1988 at Scott Malchow Productions
Graphics: Margaret McDermott
Photos: Dan Corrigan
Technical assistance: Bill Kubeczko
Type by Luke at Great Faces, Inc.

References

1989 albums
Boiled in Lead albums